

Günther Hoffmann-Schönborn (1 May 1905 – 4 April 1970) was a general in the Wehrmacht of Nazi Germany during World War II. He was a recipient of the Knight's Cross of the Iron Cross with Oak Leaves.

Awards 
 Iron Cross (1939) 2nd Class (31 May 1940) & 1st Class (29 June 1940)
 Knight's Cross of the Iron Cross with Oak Leaves
 Knight's Cross on 14 May 1941 as Major and commander of Sturm-Geschütz-Abteilung 191
 49th Oak Leaves on 31 December 1941 as Major and commander of Sturm-Geschütz-Abteilung 191

References

Citations

Bibliography

 
 

1905 births
1970 deaths
Military personnel from Poznań
People from the Province of Posen
Major generals of the German Army (Wehrmacht)
Recipients of the Knight's Cross of the Iron Cross with Oak Leaves
German prisoners of war in World War II